Forum: International Journal of Interpretation and Translation is a biannual peer-reviewed academic journal covering translation studies. It was established in 2003 by Marianne Lederer and Choi Jungwha  and is published by John Benjamins.

Abstracting and indexing
The journal is abstracted and indexed in:
Emerging Sources Citation Index 
ERIH PLUS
Linguistic Bibliography/Bibliographie Linguistique 
MLA International Bibliography
Scopus

References

External links

Multilingual journals
Biannual journals
Translation journals
Publications established in 2003
John Benjamins academic journals